Hickory Township, Pennsylvania may refer to several places in the U.S. state of Pennsylvania:

 Hickory Township, Forest County, Pennsylvania
 Hickory Township, Lawrence County, Pennsylvania

Pennsylvania township disambiguation pages